The Serio (Lombard: Sère) is an Italian river that flows entirely within Lombardy, crossing the provinces of Bergamo and Cremona.

Its valley is known as the Val Seriana.

References

External links

Rivers of Italy
Rivers of Lombardy
Rivers of the Province of Bergamo
Rivers of the Province of Cremona